Peter Copley (b. Hove, East Sussex, 14 March 1962) is a British composer, cellist and pianist.

As a boy, Copley was a pupil at Brighton College; he went on to study composition at the Royal Academy of Music and privately with Hans Keller. In 1985, he was awarded a Polish government scholarship to study at the Akademia Muzyczna in Krakow with Marek Stachowski. He subsequently completed a master's degree and Doctorate at the University of Sussex.

Copley studied at the Dartington International Summer School in 1981 and 1983; in 2000 he made the first of several recent visits as a teacher and featured composer.

Apart from his composing and performing, Peter is a visiting tutor at Sussex and Oxford Universities and an Associate Lecturer for the Open University, where he is also a Research Associate for the Music Faculty. A significant part of his output consists of educational music.

In 1994, Peter Copley co - founded New Music Brighton, a collective of composers working in the Sussex region.

Copley's many works include Farnham Fantasia for strings, recently performed in both the Royal Festival and Royal Albert Halls, and the Concerto for Trumpet, Strings and Percussion, first performed by John Wallace and the Brighton Philharmonic Orchestra under Barry Wordsworth as part of the orchestra’s 75th Birthday Weekend. Among his recent compositions are Elegiac Variations for Jan and Jane, for two violas and string orchestra, and Conversation Piece, for Percussion Ensemble, commissioned by Brighton & Hove Music Service.

2009 – 10 commissions include music for three short stories by Catherine Smith commissioned by Lewes Live Literature, a work for Sir John Tomlinson and the Brighton Youth Orchestra for the 2010 Brighton Festival and a composition for mandolin, commissioned by Alison Stephens for the 2010 Dartington International Summer School.

Selected works
 Miniature Overture (1999) commissioned for the Schubert Ensemble
 Unfrozen Architecture (1999) commissioned for Southern Winds.
 A City Awakes (2001) commissioned by the Brighton & Hove Philharmonic Society in celebration of Brighton and Hove’s elevation to city status.
 Concerto for Flute, Strings and Harp (2003)
 A Song to the Dawn for Soprano Solo, Chorus and Orchestra (2006), commissioned by the Brighton Festival
 Fantasy Sonata for Clarinet and Piano (2007), written for Steve Dummer and Yoko Ono
 Gridshell Symphonies for trombone quartet and string quartet (2008), commissioned for the Arts Council's Architecture 08 festival.
 Sealife Stomp for percussion ensemble (2009), commissioned by Brighton & Hove Music Service
 A Copper Garland (versions for full orchestra and string orchestra)
 Dementia Diaries, incidental music for the play by Maria Jastrzebska, for flute and cello
 Partita for Piano Quartet (2009)

Recordings
 Miniature Overture, on the album Bright Future (NMC Records, 2003), perf'd by The Schubert Ensemble of London

References

External links
 Peter Copley's page on the 'New Music Brighton' website

British composers
Living people
Year of birth missing (living people)